Michael Birch may refer to:

 Michael Birch (businessman) (born 1970), English computer programmer and entrepreneur
 Michael Birch (journalist) (1944–1968), Australian journalist
 Michael Birch, yachtsman, see Route du Rhum